Crymelon is a Locality near Warracknabeal in Victoria, Australia.

The locality had a Baptist church, and was described as an "important Baptist stronghold". Crymelon had a tennis club and played for the Yellangip Tennis Association Trophy. Today, little of the locality remains.

References

Towns in Victoria (Australia)
Wimmera